Rhys Lovegrove (born 11 March 1987) is an Australian rugby league coach who is the head coach of the Keighley Cougars in Betfred League 1 and a former professional rugby league footballer who played in the 2000s and 2010s.

After retiring from playing Lovegrove moved into coaching and took up his first head coaching role at Cougar Park in June 2019.

Background
Lovegrove was born in Sydney, New South Wales, Australia.

A Como Jannali Crocadiles junior who, while attending Endeavour Sports High School, played for the Australian Schoolboys Team in 2004.

Playing career
He was initially signed by the Hull Kingston Rovers on loan from the St George-Illawarra Dragons until the end of the 2007 Super League season, but then made the move permanent. In September 2014, he joined the London Broncos.

He was named in the Scotland Training Squad for the 2008 Rugby League World Cup, but he was forced to withdraw through injury.

In August 2016 he announced his retirement due to injury from playing to join the coaching staff at the Bradford Bulls.

Following periods on the coaching staff at Bradford and Doncaster, Lovegrove joined Keighley Cougars as assistant coach in January 2019 and was appointed as head coach in June 2019 following the sacking of Craig Lingard the previous month.

References

External links
Cronulla-Sutherland Sharks Official Player Profile

1987 births
Living people
Australian rugby league coaches
Australian rugby league players
Australian people of Scottish descent
Bradford Bulls players
Hull Kingston Rovers players
Keighley Cougars coaches
London Broncos players
People educated at Endeavour Sports High School
Rugby league players from Sydney
Rugby league props